The Maine Narrow Gauge Railroad Co. & Museum is a  narrow gauge railway, located in Portland, Maine, United States.

History
Operating out of the former Portland Company Marine Complex, the organization was founded in 1993 and continues to operate as of 2022. The collection consists of passenger and freight equipment, as well as artifacts from the  narrow gauge railways that ran in the state of Maine in the late 19th century and early 20th century.

Historic steam and diesel locomotives and a variety of restored coaches are used to run passenger services on the railroad.

Locomotive roster

Gallery

References

External links 

 Official web site

Railroad museums in Maine
Heritage railroads in Maine
2 ft gauge railways in the United States
Narrow gauge railroads in Maine
Museums in Portland, Maine
Munjoy Hill
Museums established in 1993
Articles containing video clips